Jaʿfar ibn Muḥammad ibn ʿAlī al-Ṣādiq (702 – 765 CE), commonly known as Jaʿfar al-Ṣādiq, was an 8th-century Shia Muslim scholar, jurist, and theologian. He was the founder of the Jaʿfarī school of Islamic jurisprudence and the sixth Imam of the Twelver and Ismāʿīlī denominations of Shīʿa Islam. The traditions (ḥadīth) recorded from al-Ṣādiq and his predecessor, Muḥammad ibn ʿAlī al-Bāqir, are said to be more numerous than all the ḥadīth reports preserved from the Islamic prophet Muhammad and the other Shīʿīte Imams combined.

Al-Ṣādiq is also important to Sunnīs as a jurist and transmitter of ḥadīth, and a teacher to the Sunnī scholars and Imams Abū Ḥanīfa al-Nuʿmān and Mālik ibn Anas, who founded the Ḥanafī and Mālikī schools of Sunnī jurisprudence, respectively. Al-Ṣādiq also figures prominently in the initiatic chains of many Sufi orders. A wide range of religious and scientific works were attributed to him, though no works penned by al-Ṣādiq remain extant. 

Jaʿfar al-Ṣādiq was born around 700 CE, perhaps in 702. He was about thirty-seven when his father, Muḥammad al-Bāqir, died after designating him as the next Imam. As the sixth Shīʿīte Imam, al-Ṣādiq kept aloof from the political conflicts that embroiled the region, evading the requests for support that he received from rebels. He was the victim of some harassment by the Abbasid caliphs and was eventually, according to Shīʿīte sources, poisoned at the instigation of the caliph al-Mansur. The question of succession after al-Ṣādiq's death divided the early Shīʿa community. Some considered the next Imam to be his eldest son, Ismāʿīl ibn Jaʿfar, who had predeceased his father. Others accepted the Imamate of his younger son and brother of Ismāʿīl, Mūsā al-Kāẓim. The first group became known as the Ismāʿīlīs, whereas the second and larger group was named Jaʽfari or the Twelvers.

Life

Birth and early life
Jaʿfar ibn Muḥammad ibn ʿAlī al-Ṣādiq was born in Medina around 700 CE, and 702 is given in most sources, according to Gleave. Jaʿfar was the eldest son of Muḥammad ibn ʿAlī al-Bāqir, the fifth Shīʿīte Imam, who was a descendant of ʿAlī ibn Abī Ṭālib, Muhammad's cousin and son-in-law, and Fāṭima, Muhammad's daughter. Jaʿfar's mother, Umm Farwah, was a great-granddaughter of the first rāshidūn caliph, Abū Bakr. During the first fourteen years of his life, Jaʿfar lived alongside his grandfather, Zayn al-Abidin, the fourth Shīʿīte Imam, and witnessed the latter's withdrawal from politics and his limited efforts amid the popular appeal of Muhammad ibn al-Hanafiyya. Jaʿfar also noted the respect that the famous scholars of Medina held toward Zayn al-Abidin. In his mother's house, Jaʿfar also interacted with his grandfather, Qasim ibn Muhammad ibn Abi Bakr, a famous traditionalist of his time. The Umayyad rule reached its peak in this period, and the childhood of al-Ṣādiq coincided with the growing interest of Medinans in religious sciences and the interpretations of the Quran. With the death of Zayn al-Abidin, Jaʿfar entered his early manhood and participated in his father's efforts as the representative of the Household of Muhammad (Ahl al-Bayt). Jaʿfar performed the  ritual with his father, al-Bāqir, and accompanied him when the latter was summoned to Damascus by the Umayyad caliph Hisham for questioning.

Under the Umayyad rulers
Most Umayyad rulers are often described by Muslim historians as corrupt, irreligious, and treacherous. The widespread political and social dissatisfaction with the Umayyad Caliphate was spearheaded by the prophet's extended family, who were seen by Muslims as God-inspired leaders in their religious struggle to establish justice over impiety. Al-Sadiq's imamate extended over the latter half of the Umayyad Caliphate, which was marked by many (often Shia) revolts and eventually witnessed the violent overthrow of the Umayyads by the Abbasids, the descendants of the prophet's paternal uncle al-Abbas. Al-Sadiq maintained his father's policy of quietism in this period and, in particular, was not involved in the uprising of his uncle, Zayd, who enjoyed the support of the Mu'tazilites and the traditionalists of Medina and Kufa. Al-Sadiq also played no role in the Abbasid overthrow of the Umayyads. His response to a request for help from Abu Muslim, the Khorasani rebel leader, was to burn his letter, saying, "This man is not one of my men, this time is not mine." At the same time, al-Sadiq did not advance his claims to the caliphate, even though he saw himself as the divinely designated leader of the Islamic community. This spiritual, rather than political, imamate of al-Sadiq was accompanied by his teaching of the  doctrine (religious dissimulation) to protect the Shia against prosecution by Sunni rulers. In this period, al-Sadiq taught quietly in Medina and developed his considerable reputation as a scholar, according to Momen.

Under the Abbasid rulers
The years of transition from the Umayyads to the Abbasids was a period of weak central authority, allowing al-Sadiq to teach freely. Some four thousand scholars are thus reported to have studied under al-Sadiq. Among these were Abu Ḥanifa and Malik ibn Anas, founders of the Hanafi and Maliki schools of law in Sunni Islam. Wasil ibn Ata, founder of the Mu'tazila school of thought, was also among his pupils. After their overthrow of the Umayyad Caliphate, the Abbasids violently prosecuted their former Shia allies against the Umayyads. Because they had relied on the public sympathy for the Ahl al-Bayt to attain power, the Abbasids considered al-Sadiq a potential threat to their rule. As the leader of the politically quiet branch of the Shia, he was summoned by al-Mansur to Baghdad but was reportedly able to convince the caliph to let him stay in Medina by quoting the hadith, "The man who goes away to make a living will achieve his purpose, but he who sticks to his family will prolong his life." Al-Sadiq remained passive in 762 CE to the failed uprising of his nephew, Muhammad al-Nafs al-Zakiyya. Nevertheless, he was arrested and interrogated by al-Mansur and held in Samarra, near Baghdad, before being allowed to return to Medina. His house was burned by order of al-Mansur, though he was unharmed, and there are reports of multiple arrests and attempts on his life by the caliph.

Imamate

Jaʿfar al-Ṣādiq was about thirty-seven when his father, al-Bāqir, died after designating him as the next Shīʿīte Imam. He held the Imamate for at least twenty-eight years. His Imamate coincided with a crucial period in the history of Islam, as he witnessed both the overthrow of the Umayyad Caliphate by the Abbasids in the mid-8th century (661–750 CE) and later the Abbasids' prosecution of their former Shīʿīte allies against the Umayyads. The leadership of the early Shīʿa community was also disputed among its different factions. In this period, the various Alid uprisings against the Umayyads and later the Abbasids gained considerable support among the Shia. Among the leaders of these movements were Zayd ibn Ali (al-Sadiq's uncle), Yahya bin Zayd (al-Sadiq's cousin), Muhammad al-Nafs al-Zakiyya and his brother (al-Sadiq's nephews). These claimants saw the imamate and caliphate as inseparable for establishing the rule of justice, according to Jafri. In particular, Zayd argued that the imamate could belong to any descendant of Hasan or Husayn who is learned, pious, and revolts against the tyrants of his time. In contrast, similar to his father and his grandfather, al-Sadiq adopted a quiescent attitude and kept aloof from politics. He viewed the imamate and caliphate as separate institutions until such time that God would make the Imam victorious. Al-Sadiq did not originate this theory of imamate, which was already adopted by his predecessors, Zayn al-Abidin and al-Baqir. Rather, al-Sadiq leveraged the sudden climate of political instability to freely propagate and elaborate the Shia teachings, including the theory of imamate.

Succession
After the death of Ja'far al-Sadiq, his following fractured, and the largest group, who came to be known as the Twelvers, followed his younger son, Musa al-Kadhim. It also appears that many expected the next Imam to be al-Sadiq's eldest son, Isma'il, who predeceased his father. This group, which later formed the Isma'ili branch, either believed that Isma'il was still alive or instead accepted the imamate of Isma'il's son, Muhammad. While the Twelvers and the Isma'ilis are the only extant Shia sects today, there were more factions at the time: Some followers of al-Sadiq accepted the imamate of his eldest surviving son, Abdullah al-Aftah. Several influential followers of al-Sadiq are recorded to have first followed Abdullah and then changed their allegiance to Musa. As Abdullah later died childless, the majority of his followers returned to Musa. A minority of al-Sadiq's followers joined his other son, Muhammad al-Dibaj, who led an unsuccessful uprising against Caliph al-Ma'mun, after which he abdicated and publicly confessed his error. A final group believed that al-Sadiq was not dead and would return as Mahdi, the promised savior in Islam.

Death

Al-Sadiq died in 765 CE (148 AH) at sixty-four or sixty-five. His death in Shia sources is attributed to poisoning at the instigation of al-Mansur. According to Tabatabai, after being detained in Samarra, al-Sadiq was allowed to return to Medina, where he spent the rest of his life in hiding until he was poisoned by order of al-Mansur. He was buried in the al-Baqi Cemetery in Medina, and his tomb was a place of pilgrimage until 1926. It was then that Wahhabis, under the leadership of Ibn Saud, the founding King of Saudi Arabia, conquered Medina for the second time and razed all the tombs except that of the Islamic prophet. According to Tabatabai, upon hearing the news of his death, al-Mansur ordered the governor of Medina to behead al-Sadiq's heir, the future Imam. The governor, however, learned that al-Sadiq had chosen four people, rather than one, to administer his will: al-Mansur himself, the governor, the Imam's oldest (surviving) son Abdullah al-Aftah, and Musa al-Kazim, his younger son. Al-Mansur's plot was thus thwarted.

Family
Al-Sadiq married Fatima, a descendant of Hasan, with whom he had two sons, Isma'il (the sixth Isma'ili Imam) and Abdullah al-Aftah. He also married Hamida Khatun, a slave-girl from Berber or Andalusia, who bore al-Sadiq three more sons: Musa al-Kazim (the seventh Twelver Imam), Muhammad al-Dibaj, and Ishaq al-Mu'tamin. She was known as Hamida the Pure and respected for her religious learning. Al-Sadiq often referred other women to learn the tenets of Islam from her. He is reported to have praised her, "Hamida is removed from every impurity like an ingot of pure gold." Ishaq al-Mu'tamin, is said to have married Sayyida Nafisa, a descendant of Hasan.

Contributions
After Ali, al-Sadiq is possibly the most famed religious scholar of the House of Muhammad, widely recognized as an authority in Islamic law, theology, hadith, and esoteric and occult sciences. Amir-Moezzi considers him possibly the most brilliant scholar of his time, and the variety of (at times contradictory) views ascribed to al-Sadiq suggest that he was an influential figure in the history of early Islamic thought, as nearly all the early intellectual factions of Islam (except perhaps the Kharijites) wished to incorporate al-Sadiq into their history in order to bolster their schools’ positions. He is cited in a wide range of historical sources, including the works of al-Tabari, Ya'qubi, al-Masudi, and Ibn Khallikan. This popularity, however, has hampered the scholarly attempts to ascertain al-Sadiq's actual views. A number of religious and scientific works also bear al-Sadiq's name, though scholars generally regard them as inauthentic. It seems likely that he was a teacher who left writing to others. 
The most extensive contributions of al-Sadiq were to the Twelver Shia, helping establish them as a serious intellectual force in the late Umayyad and early Abbasid periods, according to Gleave. Tabatabai writes that the number of traditions left behind by al-Sadiq and his father, al-Baqir, were more than all the hadiths recorded from Muhammad and the other Shia Imams combined. Shia thought has continued to develop based on the teachings of the Shia Imams, including al-Sadiq. According to Rizvi, al-Sadiq preached against slavery.

Doctrine of imamate 
Following his predecessors, Zayn al-Abidin and al-Baqir, al-Sadiq further elaborated the Shia doctrine of imamate, which has become the hallmark of the Twelver and Isma'ili Shia theologies, but rejected by the Zaydis. As the successor of Muhammad, the Imam has an all-inclusive mandate for temporal and religious leadership of the Islamic community, though this doctrine views the imamate and caliphate as separate institutions until such time that God would make the Imam victorious. The Imam also inherits from his predecessor the special knowledge, which qualifies him for the position. Similar to Muhammad, Imam is believed to be infallible thanks to this unique knowledge, which also establishes him as the sole authorized source for interpreting the revelation and guiding the Muslims along the right path. This line of Imams in Shia Islam is traced back to Ali, who succeeded Muhammad through a divine decree.

Ja'fari school of law
Law in Islam is an all-embracing body of ordinances that govern worship and ritual in addition to a proper legal system. Building on the work of his father, al-Sadiq is remembered as the eponymous founder of the Ja'fari school of law, followed by the Twelver Shia. According to Lalani, the Isma'ili jurisprudence, as codified by al-Qadi al-Numan, is also primarily based on the large corpus of statements left behind by al-Sadiq and his father, al-Baqir. Al-Sadiq denounced the contemporary use of opinion, personal juristic reasoning, and analogical reasoning as human attempts to impose regularity and predictability onto the laws of God. He argued that God's law is occasional and unpredictable and that Muslims should submit to the inscrutable will of God as revealed by the Imam. He also embraced a devolved system of legal authority: it is ascribed to al-Sadiq that, "It is for us [the Imams] to set out foundational rules and principles, and it is for you [the learned] to derive the specific legal rulings for actual cases." Similarly, when asked how legal disputes within the community should be solved, al-Sadiq described the state apparatus as evil and encouraged the Shia to refer to "those who relate our [i.e., the Imams'] hadiths" because the Imams have "made such a one a judge over you." The Sunni jurisprudence is based on the three pillars of the Quran, the practices of Muhammad, and consensus, whereas the Twelver Shia jurisprudence adds to these pillars a fourth pillar of reasoning during the occultation of Mahdi. In Shia Islam,  also includes the practices of the Shia Imams.

Doctrine of taqiya 

 is a form of religious dissimulation, where an individual can hide one's beliefs under persecution.  was introduced by al-Baqir and later advocated by al-Sadiq to protect his followers from prosecution at the time when al-Mansur, the Abbasid caliph, conducted a brutal campaign against the Alids and their supporters. This doctrine is based on verse 16:106 of the Quran, where the wrath of God is said to await the apostate "except those who are compelled while their hearts are firm in faith." According to Amir-Moezzi, in the early sources,  means "the keeping or safeguarding of the secrets of the Imams' teaching," which may have resulted at times in contradictory traditions from the Imams. In such cases, if one of the contradictory reports matches the corresponding Sunni doctrine, it would be discarded because the Imam must have had agreed with Sunnis to avoid prosecution of himself or his community. Armstrong suggests that  also kept conflict to a minimum with those religious scholars who disagreed with the Shia teachings.

Free will
On the question of predestination and free will, which was under much discussion at the time, al-Sadiq followed his father, portraying human responsibility but preserving God's autocracy, asserting that God decreed some things absolutely but left others to human agency. This compromise, widely adopted afterward, is highlighted when al-Sadiq was asked if God forces His servants to do evil or whether He had delegated power to them: he answered negatively to both questions and instead suggested, "The blessings of your Lord are between these two." Al-Sadiq taught "that God the Most High decreed some things for us and He has likewise decreed some things through our agency: what He has decreed for us or on our behalf He has concealed from us, but what He has decreed through our agency He has revealed to us. We are not concerned, therefore, so much with what He has decreed for us as we are with what He has decreed through our agency." Al-Sadiq is also credited with the statement that God does not "order created beings to do something without providing for them a means of not doing it, though they do not do it or not do it without God's permission." Al-Sadiq declared, "Whoever claims that God has ordered evil, has lied about God. Whoever claims that both good and evil are attributed to him, has lied about God." In his prayers, he often said, "There is no work of merit on my own behalf or on behalf of another, and in evil there is no excuse for me or for another."

Quranic exegesis
Al-Sadiq is attributed with what is regarded as the most important principle for judging traditions, that a hadith should be rejected if it contradicts the Quran, whatever other evidence might support it. In his books Haqaeq al-Tafsir and Ziadat Ḥaqaeq al-Tafsir, the author Abd-al-Raḥman Solami cites al-Ṣadiq as one of his major (if not the major) sources. It is said that al-Sadiq merged the inner and the outer meanings of the Quran to reach a new interpretation of it. It is ascribed to al-Sadiq that, "The Book of God [Quran] comprises four things: the statement set down, the implied purport, the hidden meanings, relating to the supra-sensible world, and the exalted spiritual doctrines. The literal statement is for the ordinary believers. The implied purport is the concern of the elite. The hidden meanings pertain to the Friends of God. The exalted spiritual doctrines are the province of the prophets." These remarks echo the statement of Ali, the first Shia Imam.

Views
Ja'far al-Sadiq's significance in the formation of early Muslim thought is demonstrated by the fact that his name is used as a reference in Sufi, scientific, Sunni legal, Ismaili, and  circles. Most of these groups desired to use his legacy for their own agendas. However, the Imami Shia tradition is the most comprehensive source for his teachings.

Shia Islam
While the Sunnis respect al-Sadiq as a transmitter of hadith and a jurist, Shiites view him as an imam and therefore infallible, and record his sayings and actions in the works of hadith and jurisprudence. In the Shia writings of the Imamiyya, his legal rulings constitute the most important source of Imamiyya law. In fact, the Imam's legal doctrine is called Ja'fari jurisprudence by both the Imamis and the Sunnis in order to refer to his legal authority.
The Shias considered al-Sadiq the only legitimate person who could represent the Sharia in his time and have the authority to rule.
According to Imami Shi'as, Ja'far al-Sadiq, is the sixth imam who was responsible for turning the imamiya into a powerful intellectual movement during the late Umayyad and early Abbasid eras.
Al-Sadiq is presented by Ya'qubi as one of the most respected personalities of his epoch, adding that it was customary to refer to al-Sadiq as 'the learned one'.

Sunni Islam 

Al-Sadiq is respected in Sunni Islam as a jurist and a master teacher of hadith sciences, who is cited in several s (chains of transmissions). Among his students were Abu Ḥanifa and Malik ibn Anas, founders of the Hanafi and Maliki schools of law in Sunni Islam.
According to Jafri, the famous Sunni jurist Malik ibn Anas would quote al-Sadiq as, "The truthful Ja'far ibn Muhammad himself told me that…" (A similar attitude is reported from Abu Hanifa.)
Malik was a teacher of al-Shafi'i, who was, in turn, a teacher of Ahmad ibn Hanbal. It has thus been noted that all of the four Imams of Sunni  are connected to Ja'far, whether directly or indirectly. Wasil ibn Ata, founder of the Mu'tazila school of thought, was also among al-Sadiq's pupils. The Sunni scholar al-Dhahabi recognizes al-Sadiq's contribution to Sunni tradition, and al-Shahrastani, the influential Sunni historian, pays al-Sadiq a high tribute in his work.

Sufism
He is also viewed at the head of the Sufi line of saints and mystics by the Sufi writers Abu Nu'aym and Farid al-Din Attar. However, some of the material attributed to al-Sadiq in the Sufi literature is said to be apocryphal. Among others, the Shia Moqaddas Ardabili has thus dismissed the alleged links between al-Sadiq and Sufism as an attempt to gain the authority of al-Sadiq for Sufi teachings. Gleave and Bowering suggest that Tafsir al-Quran, Manafe' Sowar al-Quran, and Kawass al-Qoran al-Azam, three mystical commentaries of the Quran attributed to al-Sadiq, were composed after his death because these works demonstrate a mastery of the recent lexicon of Muslim mysticism. Alternatively, Taylor is certain that the traditions in the Quranic exegesis edited by the mystic Dhu al-Nun Misri can be traced back to the Imam. Given the appeal and influence of al-Sadiq outside the circle of his Shia supporters, Algar suggests that he likely played some role in the formation of Sufism. Both Abu Nu'aym and Attar narrate several encounters between al-Sadiq and contemporary proto-Sufis to highlight his asceticism. One encounter describes how Sofyan Ṯawri, the renowned jurist and ascetic, allowed himself to reproach the Imam for his silken robe, only for the Imam to reveal beneath it a modest white woolen cloak, explaining that the finery was for men to behold and the woolen cloak for God. The Imam thus displayed the former and concealed the latter.

Ghulat

One group of them, called the Mufawidda, preached that God gave the Prophet and the imams the authority to create and take care of all living things. Many Twelver Shi'i traditions state that al-Baqir and al-Sadiq did not have supernatural abilities and did not perform the miracles attributed to them. Despite these denials, a number of hadiths that contained  concepts found their way into Twelver Shiite hadith collections.

According to some early Imami heresiographers, Abu al-Khattab (died 755) asserted that he had been chosen to serve as al-Sadiq's envoy and had been given access to his hidden doctrines. It seems that Abu al-Khattab's views on al-Sadiq's divinity and his own status as a prophetic messenger of God eventually led al-Sadiq to repudiate him in 748. His adherents were referred to as Khattabiyya. Later Twelver tradition disavows any connection between al-Sadiq and the views of Abu al-Khattab.

The same Imami heresiographers also claim that al-Mufaddal ibn Umar al-Ju'fi (died before 799) and his followers, the Mufaddaliya, likewise regarded al-Sadiq as a god and themselves as his prophets. However, it is not certain whether the Mufaddaliya ever existed, and in Twelver hadith al-Mufaddal consistently appears as the intimate companion of Ja'far al-Sadiq and his son Musa al-Kazim, with the exception of the brief period of disgrace with Jaʿfar al-Sadiq due to his Khattabiyya leanings. According to Twelver traditions, al-Mufaddal was even appointed by al-Sadiq to control the excesses of Khattabiyya. Nevertheless, al-Mufaddal's status as a close confidant of Ja'far al-Sadiq led to a large number of writings being attributed to him by later authors, including major  works such as the Kitab al-Haft wa-l-azilla ('Book of the Seven and the Shadows') and the Kitab al-Sirat ('Book of the Path').

Works
A large number of religious books bear al-Sadiq's name as their author, but none of them can be attributed to al-Sadiq with certainty. 
It has been suggested that al-Sadiq was a writer who left the work of writing to his students. In this regard, some of the works attributed to Jabir ibn Hayyan also claim to be mere expositions al-Sadiq's teachings.
A Quran commentary, a book on divination (Ketb al-jafr), numerous drafts of his will, and several collections of legal dicta are among the works attributed to al-Sadiq.

Exegesis
Most of the extant writings attributed to al-Sadiq are commentaries on the Quran:
In Sufi circles, a number of mystical Quranic exegeses are attributed to al-Sadiq, such as Tafsir al-Quran, Manafe' Sowar al-Quran, and Kawass al-Quran al-Azam.

According to Ibn Khaldun this book was transmitted from al-Sadiq and written down by Hārūn ibn Saʿīd al-ʿIjlī.

This text was first introduced to modern scholarship by Louis Massignon, and was later published in a critical edition by Paul Nwyia. Another version was published by ʿAlī Zayʿūr. One of the outstanding features of this exegesis is its emphasis on letter mysticism. It is considered to be the oldest mystical commentary of the Quran after Sahl al-Tustari's exegesis.

Tafsīr al-Nuʿmānī is another exegesis attributed to al-Sadiq, which he supposedly narrated on the authority of Ali from the prophet Muhammad. This treatise was compiled by Muhammad ibn Ibrahim al-Nu'mani - known as Ibn Abi Zainab. The 17th-century scholar Mohammad-Baqer Majlesi recorded it in his . A summary of it has also been attributed to the Twelver theologian Sharif al-Murtaza and was published under the title .

Tafsīr al-Imām al-Ṣādiq is another commentary attributed to al-Sadiq, which Agha Bozorg Tehrani mentions it in his book al-Dharī'a under the title Tafsir al-Imam Ja'far bin Muhammad al-Sadiq and it is believed that one of Sadiq's students narrated it from him. Fuat Sezgin calls this work Tafsīr al-Qurʾān. A copy of it with the title Tafsīr al-Imām al-Ṣādiq, according to Bankipur Oriental Library's catalogue, is written by al-Nuʿmānī based on the sayings of al-Sadiq. This commentary is arranged according to the Surahs of the Quran and covers only the words of the Quran that require explanation. This commentary, which is a type of mystical commentary, deals with both the exoteric (ẓāhir) and the esoteric (bāṭin) aspects of the Quran. It is mostly about God and his relationship with mankind, also man's knowledge of God and the relationship between Muhammad and God.

Tawhid al-Mufaddal

The work presents itself as a dialogue between al-Mufaddal and Ja'far al-Sadiq, who is the main speaker.

Rather than by Shi'i doctrine, their content appears to be influenced by Mu'tazilism, a rationalistic school of Islamic speculative theology.

The  is in fact a revised version of a work falsely attributed to the famous Mu'tazili litterateur al-Jahiz (died 868) under the title  ('Book of Proofs and Contemplation on Creation and Administration').

Other works

Misbah al-Sharia and Miftah al-Haqiqah is another work attributed to al-Sadiq. It is on personal conduct, with chapters on various topics such as legal interests interspersed with general moral issues, and advice on how to lead a spiritual life and thus purify the soul.
As the first person who came across this book in the 7th century A.H., Sayyed Ibn Tawus described it as a collection of hadiths of Jafar al-Sadiq. It includes a prediction of future events and sufferings. There is a specific Shia chapter in "Knowledge of the Imams" in which the names of all the Imams (both before al-Sadiq and after him) are mentioned during the exchange of reports between the Prophet Muhammad and Salman the Persian. Mohammad Baqer Majlesi considered this work to have been written by Shaqiq al-Balkhi, who supposedly quoted it from "one of the people of knowledge," and not explicitly from Ja'far al-Sadiq. Despite Majlesi's doubts about its authenticity, this work remains very popular as a manual of personal worship and has been the subject of a number of commentaries by prominent Shia and Sufi scholars. It has also been translated into different languages. Its manuscript is available in the library of Gotha.

There is also a book on dream interpretation that is attributed to al-Sadiq and is known by the name Taqsim al-roʾyā. It is identical to the work Ketāb al-taqsim fi taʿbir al-ḥolm, which is credited to Ja'far al-Sadiq. Eighty various types of dream sightings, ranging from the religious (dreams of God, angels, prophets, and imams) to the profane (dreams of meat, fat, and cheese), are interpreted by Ja'far al-Sadiq in this book. According to Robert Gleave, it is not always clear whether they can be regarded as works attributed to Jafar al-Sadiq or works attributed to Ali ibn Abi Talib that is transmitted through Ja'far al-Sadiq. From a Shia perspective, this is not problematic because there is no discernible difference between the knowledge of one imam and that of another from a religious perspective.

The Kitāb al-Ihlīlaja is presented as al-Sadiq's opinions transmitted through al-Mufaddal. The work is allegedly a response to al-Mufaddal's request for a refutation of atheists.
Jafar al-Sadiq describes his own argument with an atheist Indian doctor in it. The discussion took place as the doctor prepared a myrobalan plant-based medication (known in Arabic as Ihlīlaj, and hence the title of the work).

Shia disciples
Momen contends that of the few thousand students who are said to have studied under al-Sadiq, only a few could have been Shia, considering that al-Sadiq did not openly advance his claims to the imamate. Notable Shia students of al-Sadiq included 

 Hisham ibn al-Hakam was a famous disciple of al-Sadiq, who proposed a number of doctrines that later became orthodox in the Twelver theology, including the rational necessity of the divinely-guided imam in every age to teach and lead God's community.
 Aban ibn Taghlib was an outstanding jurist and traditionist and an associate of al-Sadiq in Kufa, but also of Zayn al-Abidin and al-Baqir. The latter is reported to have praised Aban, "Sit in the mosque of Kufa and give legal judgment to the people. Indeed I would like to see among my Shia people like you."

 Burayd ibn Mu'awiya al-'Ijli in Kufa was a famous disciple of al-Baqir and later al-Sadiq, who later became a key authority in the Shia jurisprudence. Al-Baqir praised him (along with Abu Basir Moradi, Muhammad bin Muslim, and Zurarah) as worthy of the paradise.
 Abu Basir al-Asadi was considered one of the poles of the intellectual leadership of the Imami community of Kufa. His name is included in the number of six companions of al-Baqir and al-Sadiq that hadiths narrated by any one of them is considered authentic by many Shi'a scholars. Some consider Abu Basir al-Moradi as one of those six people instead of Abu Basir al-Asadi.
 Abu Basir Moradi, a famous Shia jurist and traditionist, was another associate of al-Baqir and al-Sadiq. Al-Sadiq is believed to have told Moradi, Zurarah, Burayd, and Muhammad ibn Muslim that the prophetic hadiths would have been lost without them.
 Abu Ja'far Muhammad ibn Ali ibn Nu'man known as Mu'min al-Taq was a distinguished theologist in Kufa and a devoted follower of al-Baqir and al-Sadiq, whose debates about imamate are famous. Kitab al-Imamah and Kitab al_Radd alla al-Muazila fi Imamat al-Mafdul are among his works.
 Zurarah ibn Ayan in Kufa was a disciple of al-Hakam ibn Utayba before joining al-Baqir. As a prominent traditionist and theologian, Zurarah played an important role in developing the Shia thought. Zurarah lived long enough to also become a close disciple of Ja'far al-Sadiq.
 Fudayl ibn Yasar is another notable associate of both al-Baqir and al-Sadiq, about whom al-Sadiq said what the prophet had said about Salman the Persian, that "Fudayl is from us, the Ahl al-Bayt."
 Maymun ibn al-Aswad al-Qaddah was a devout supporter of al-Baqir and his son, al-Sadiq. Not educated but with an impressive personality, Maymun probably committed to writing what he heard from the Imams. His son, Abd Allah, is the alleged ancestor of the Isma'ili imams.

Selected quotes 
 "The most perfect of men in intellect is the best of them in ethics."
 "He who answers all that he is asked, surely is mad."
 "Whoever fears God, God makes all things fear him; and whoever does not fear God, God makes him fear all things."
 "God Almighty has said: people are dear to me as family. Therefore, the best of them is the one who is nicer to others and does his best to resolve their needs."
 "One of the deeds God Almighty appreciates the most is making his pious servants happy. This can be done through fulfilling their hunger, sweeping away their sorrows, or paying off their debts."

See also

 Family tree of Muhammad
 Imamate (Shia doctrine)
 Imamate (Twelver doctrine)

Notes

References

Citations

Sources 

 

 ( in vol. 3, pp. 57–151;  in vol. 3, pp. 152–198)

 
 

 
 
 

 
 
 

 
 
 

 

 
 
 
 (reprinted in )

Further reading

External links

 Imam al-Sadiq by Shaykh Mohammed al-Husayn al-Muzaffar
 Tawheed al-Mufadhdhal possibly dictated by al-Sadiq to al-Mufadhdhal

702 births
765 deaths
8th-century Arabs
8th-century people from the Abbasid Caliphate
8th-century writers
8th-century imams
Twelve Imams
Ismaili imams
Deaths by poisoning
Husaynids
Assassinated royalty
Burials at Jannat al-Baqī